Christian Samir Martínez Centeno (born 8 September 1990 in La Ceiba) is a Honduran football striker, who most recently played for F.C. Motagua.

Club career
Still a youngster, Martínez was bought by Serie A's Cagliari, arriving from Victoria. He would leave after just one season, having gathered no first-team appearances.

In the summer of 2008, Martínez joined Portugal's Rio Ave, although he spent the season with its junior side. Then he left for Peñarol, hoping to gain more first-team experience, but returned home after a few weeks, joining Real España. In August 2012, he signed for F.C. Motagua.

International career
Internationally, Martínez participated in the 2007 Pan American Games in Rio de Janeiro, also attending the 2007 FIFA U-17 World Cup in South Korea, scoring against Spain. He also played for Honduras at the 2009 FIFA U-20 World Cup in Egypt.

Martinez made his senior debut for Honduras in a September 2010 friendly match against El Salvador and has, as of January 2013, earned a total of 2 caps, scoring no goals.

References

External links

Stats and profile at Zerozero

1990 births
Living people
People from La Ceiba
Association football forwards
Honduran footballers
Honduras international footballers
C.D. Victoria players
Peñarol players
Real C.D. España players
F.C. Motagua players
Liga Nacional de Fútbol Profesional de Honduras players
Honduran expatriate footballers
Expatriate footballers in Uruguay